Shamsuddin Abul Kalam (19261997), was an actor and an author of Bengali literature in Bangladesh. He was born in Barisal. He is the maternal uncle of A.M. Harun-ar-Rashid.

Life
At first, his name was 'Abul Kalam Shamsuddin', but the editor of the Daily Azad had the same name, so Shamsuddin adapted to the current form of his name. He was born in 1926 in Kamdevpur village under Nolsiti Thana in Barisal district. His father was Akram Ali Munsi, and his mother was Meherunnessa. He had four sisters (Jahanara Begum, Raushonara Begum, Momtaj Begum, and Saida Akhtar) and he was the only son of his parents.

He matriculated from Barisal Zila School in 1941, and completed his IA from Brajomohan College in 1943, and BA from Calcutta University in 1946. He was actively involved in the independence movement of India as a student and was a member of the central committee of the Bengal Student Congress. He was also involved in the liberation war of Bangladesh in 1971 from Italy. Rome University awarded Kalam the DLitt degree. He was also awarded a diploma on cinema from the Experimental Centre of Cinematography in Rome. He spent considerable time abroad and played roles in several Italian movies, one of these was Le coppie (1970) with Alberto Sordi.

Works
In his works, the rural life of Bengali people is seen widely. Emotion and romanticism are widely seen in his works.

Novels
 Kashboner Konya (The Girl in the Reeds, 1954)
 Dui Mahol (Two Mansions, 1955)
 Kanchonmala (The Gold Necklace, 1956)
 Jibon Kando (The Parts of Life, 1956)
 Jaijongol (The Wilderness, 1978)
 Somudrobasor (Coastal House, 1986)
 Nobanno (The Nobanno Ceremony, 1987)
 Jar Sathe Jar (Who Suits Whom, 1986)
 Moner Moto Thain (A Suitable Place, 1985)
 Kanchongram (The Golden Village, 1997)

Story collections
 Onek Diner Asha (Hopes of Many Days, 1952)
 Dheu (Waves, 1953)
 Path Jana Nai (Don't Know the Way, 1953)
 Dui Hridoyer Tir (1955)
 Saher Banu (1957)

References

 Golpo Songroho (Collected Stories), the national textbook of B.A. (pass and subsidiary) course of Bangladesh, published by University of Dhaka in 1979 (reprint in 1986).
 Bangla Sahitya (Bengali Literature), the national textbook of intermediate (college) level of Bangladesh published in 1996 by all educational boards.

External links
 Bangladeshinovels.com

Bengali-language writers
Bengali novelists
Bangladeshi male novelists
People from Barisal
1926 births
1997 deaths
University of Calcutta alumni
20th-century novelists
20th-century Bangladeshi male writers